Jayanta Paul (born 30 December 1992 in West Bengal) is an Indian professional footballer who plays as a goalkeeper for United S.C. on loan from East Bengal in the I-League.

Career
He was a regular first choice goalkeeper for East Bengal U-19 squad before he signed for senior team of East Bengal.

United
Paul signed for United S.C. in January 2014 on loan from East Bengal. He made his debut on 14 January 2014 in the Indian Federation Cup match against Churchill Brothers at Jawaharlal Nehru Stadium, Kochi in which he played the whole match as United lost the match 2-1.

International
Jayanta was part of India U-16 in 2008 AFC U-16 Championship held in Tashkent.

Career statistics

References

External links 
 Profile at Goal.com

1992 births
Living people
Indian footballers
East Bengal Club players
United SC players
Association football goalkeepers
Footballers from West Bengal
I-League players
India youth international footballers